Rucava is a village in South Kurzeme Municipality, Latvia. Rucava had 550 residents as of 2006.

Towns and villages in Latvia
South Kurzeme Municipality
Courland